Kal-e Sorkh may refer to:
 Kal-e Sorkh, Razavi Khorasan
 Kal-e Sorkh, South Khorasan